Richard Lahey (June 23, 1893 – August 1, 1978) was an American painter. His work was part of the painting event in the art competition at the 1932 Summer Olympics.

References

1893 births
1978 deaths
20th-century American painters
American male painters
Olympic competitors in art competitions
Artists from Jersey City, New Jersey
20th-century American male artists